Štěpánov is a town in Olomouc District in the Olomouc Region of the Czech Republic. It has about 3,500 inhabitants.

Administrative parts
Villages of Březce and Moravská Huzová are administrative parts of Štěpánov.

Geography
It is located in the fertile agricultural region of Haná between the rivers Oskava and Morava, which form parts of the municipal border.

History
Štěpánov was first mentioned in the donation deed of King Ottokar I of Bohemia from 1201.

From 1976, Liboš was an administrative part of Štěpánov, but it became independent on 24 November 1990. Štěpánov obtained the town status in 2020.

Sights
The most notable building is the Church of Saint Lawrence. The construction of this Baroque church was finished in 1773.

Twin towns – sister cities

Štěpánov is twinned with:
 Środa Śląska, Poland

References

External links

Cities and towns in the Czech Republic
Populated places in Olomouc District